Leonard Stogel (September 23, 1934 – May 25, 1979) was an American music business manager, promoter, record producer and executive for the music festivals California Jam, California Jam II, and Canada Jam. He also managed Sweathog, The Cowsills, Sam the Sham, Tommy James & The Shondells, Lee Michaels, Napoleon XIV, The Royal Guardsmen, Boyce and Hart, and other musical groups. He was killed in the crash of American Airlines Flight 191 on May 25, 1979. Stogel's parents, Julius and Doris (Eisenberg) Stogel, had perished on American Airlines Flight 1 on March 1, 1962.

References

External links
Lenny Stogel - IMDB

RateYourMusic

Discogs

1934 births
1979 deaths
Accidental deaths in Illinois
American music industry executives
American music managers
Music promoters
American record producers
Victims of aviation accidents or incidents in 1979
Victims of aviation accidents or incidents in the United States
20th-century American Jews